Orstom is a genus of South Pacific brushed trapdoor spiders first described by Robert Raven in 1994.

Species
 it contains six species, all found in New Caledonia:
Orstom aoupinie Raven, 1994 – New Caledonia
Orstom chazeaui Raven & Churchill, 1994 (type) – New Caledonia
Orstom hydratemei Raven & Churchill, 1994 – New Caledonia
Orstom macmillani Raven, 1994 – New Caledonia
Orstom tropicus Raven, 1994 – New Caledonia
Orstom undecimatus Raven, 1994 – New Caledonia

References

Barychelidae
Mygalomorphae genera
Spiders of Oceania